Thomson Peak  is a peak  situated 11 nautical miles (20 km) southeast of Mount Shute at the extreme south limit of Mirabito Range. Named by the northern party of New Zealand Geological Survey Antarctic Expedition (NZGSAE), 1963–64, for Robert B. Thomson of New Zealand, scientific leader at Hallett Station, 1960; officer-in-charge at Wilkes Station, 1962; deputy leader at Scott Base, 1963–64.

See also
Red Rock Peak

References

Mountains of Victoria Land
Pennell Coast